Crossocerus exiguus  is a Palearctic species of solitary wasp.

References

External links
Images representing Crossocerus exiguus

Hymenoptera of Europe
Crabronidae
Insects described in 1829